This is a list of flag bearers who have represented Cyprus at the Olympics.

Flag bearers carry the national flag of their country at the opening ceremony of the Olympic Games.

See also
Cyprus at the Olympics

References

Cyprus at the Olympics
Cyprus
Olympic flagbearers
Olympic flagbearers